The Maryhill Stonehenge is a replica of England's Stonehenge located in Maryhill, Washington, United States. It was commissioned in the early 20th century by the wealthy entrepreneur Sam Hill, and dedicated on July 4, 1918 as a memorial to the people who had died in World War I.

The memorial is constructed of concrete, and construction was commenced in 1918 and completed in 1929.  It was listed on the National Register of Historic Places in 2021.

History
The Maryhill Stonehenge was the first monument in the United States to honor the dead of World War I – specifically, soldiers from Klickitat County, Washington, who had died in the then-ongoing war. The altar stone is placed to be aligned with sunrise on the summer solstice.

Following the then-prevalent interpretation of Stonehenge, Hill thought that the original monument had been used as a sacrificial site. He was a Quaker and commissioned the replica as a reminder that humanity is still capable of being sacrificed to the god of war.

The monument is located within the former site of the town of Maryhill; the town later burned down, leaving only the concrete replica standing. The memorial overlooks the Columbia Gorge. A second formal dedication of the monument took place on its completion on May 30, 1929. Sam Hill died in 1931, but lived long enough to see the re-installation of his Stonehenge replica completed.

The dedication plaque on this Washington Stonehenge is inscribed:

Current status
The Maryhill Stonehenge, which has nearby monuments to the soldiers of Klickitat County who died in World War II, Korea, Vietnam and Afghanistan, is now part of the Maryhill Museum of Art.

This concrete landmark is located off U.S. Highway 97, about two miles from the Sam Hill Memorial Bridge. Admission is free to visit the memorial but donations for its continued maintenance are accepted.

References

External links

Official site – Maryhill Museum of Art
Sound recordings within MaryHill Replica
Motion video within MaryHill Replica

1929 sculptures
Buildings and structures in Klickitat County, Washington
Concrete sculptures in Washington (state)
Monuments and memorials on the National Register of Historic Places in Washington (state)
National Register of Historic Places in Klickitat County, Washington
Roadside attractions in Washington (state)
Stonehenge replicas and derivatives
Tourist attractions in Klickitat County, Washington